Black Slate are a reggae band based in the United Kingdom, and formed in 1974. They toured heavily around London and backed Jamaican musicians such as Dennis Brown, Delroy Wilson, and Ken Boothe when they played in the UK. They toured the UK in their own right for the first time in 1978, and released four albums between 1979 and 1985.

History
Black Slate was formed in 1974, including musicians from England, Jamaica, and Anguilla. They backed several Jamaican singers, including Delroy Wilson and Ken Boothe on their UK appearances, and had their first reggae-chart hit themselves in 1976, with the anti-mugging song "Sticks Man", also lined up with Disco Reggae Band under Disco Reggae Band & Black Slate. The record hit the Dutch and Flemish charts as well, after being an underground hit in Antwerp discothèques. They toured the UK for the first time in 1978, and formed their own TCD label, having a minor hit with "Mind Your Motion". They also backed Dennis Brown when he played live in the UK, and in 1980 their Rastafarian rallying call, "Amigo", was picked up by Ensign Records, and broke into the UK Singles Chart, reaching no. 9. A Dub Album "Ogima" (Amigo spelled backwards), was released in 1981. The follow-up, "Boom Boom" was also a hit, though less successful. An album, Sirens in the City,  followed on Ensign the following year. The band released two further albums in 1982 and 1985.

After a ten-year hiatus they released a new EP, World Citizen, on 15 June 2013, with a UK and European Tour to follow. In November 2014, the band embarked on their first USA tour, with dates across California and Texas. The lineup featured original founding members Anthony Brightly, Chris Hanson, Desmond Mahoney and vocalist Jesse Brade. Their 2014 album Now and Then was released on TCD Records and in 2016 they followed up with Peaceful Demonstration, also on TCD.

Discography

Albums
Black Slate (1979, TCD)
Amigo (1980, Ensign, Wise Owl)
Sirens in the City (1981, Virgin, Ensign)
Rasta Festival (1981, Alligator)
Ogima (1981, Hit and Run) (CD)
Six Plus One (1982, Top Ranking)
Black Slate (1985, Sierra)
Get Up and Dance (1995, FairWood Music)
Now and Then (2014, TCD)
Peaceful Demonstration (2016, TCD)
Young Gifted and Black (2020 TCD)

Singles

Notes

See also
List of reggae musicians
List of Jamaican backing bands
List of roots reggae artists
Fabric Live 31

References

External links
 
 

British reggae musical groups
Musical groups established in 1974
Roots Reggae Library